The 2011 UNICEF Open was a tennis tournament played on outdoor grass courts. It was the 22nd edition of the UNICEF Open, and was part of the 250 Series of the 2011 ATP World Tour, and of the WTA International tournaments of the 2011 WTA Tour. Both the men's and the women's events took place at the Autotron park in Rosmalen, 's-Hertogenbosch, Netherlands, from 12 June until 18 June 2011. Dmitry Tursunov and Roberta Vinci won the singles title.

Finals

Men's singles

 Dmitry Tursunov defeated  Ivan Dodig, 6–3, 6–2
It was Tursunov's 1st title of the year and 7th of his career.

Women's singles

 Roberta Vinci defeated  Jelena Dokić, 6–7(7–9), 6–3, 7–5
 It was the 5th title of the career for Roberta Vinci, the 2nd of the year and the first on grass court.

Men's doubles

 Daniele Bracciali /  František Čermák defeated  Robert Lindstedt /  Horia Tecău, 6–3, 2–6, [10–8]

Women's doubles

 Barbora Záhlavová-Strýcová /  Klára Zakopalová defeated  Dominika Cibulková /  Flavia Pennetta, 1–6, 6–4, [10–7]

ATP entrants

Seeds

 Seedings are based on the rankings as of June 6, 2011.

Other entrants

The following players received wildcards into the main draw:
  Marcos Baghdatis
  Jesse Huta Galung
  Javier Martí

The following qualified for the main draw:

  Arnaud Clément
  Alejandro Falla
  Konstantin Kravchuk
  Ludovic Walter

WTA entrants

Seeds

 Seedings are based on the rankings of June 6, 2011.

Other entrants
The following players received wildcards into the main draw:
  Kirsten Flipkens
  Laura Robson
  Kiki Bertens

The following players received entry from the qualifying draw:

  Akgul Amanmuradova
  Romina Oprandi 
  Arantxa Rus 
  Alison van Uytvanck

References

External links
 

UNICEF Open
UNICEF Open
UNICEF Open
Rosmalen Grass Court Championships